Duan Qi was a kingdom located in Shandong peninsula of northern China during the Sixteen Kingdoms period. It was founded by Duan Kan, a member from the Duan tribe of Xianbei people. In 350, Ran Min overthrew the Later Zhao kingdom and caused chaos in the North China Plain. Duan Kan took this chance to lead his people to the city of Guanggu in Shandong and established Duan Qi kingdom. Duan Kan did not claim to be an emperor because he regarded the emperor of Jin dynasty as the son of heaven. In 351, Duan Qi became a vassal state of Jin dynasty after the emperor of Jin appointed Duan Kan to be the Zhenbei General and Duke of Qi. However, Duan Qi was still considered to be an independent state since Jin had no direct control on it.

In 355, Murong Jun, a person from another tribal clan of Xianbei, claimed to be the emperor of Former Yan. Duan Kan was annoyed because he did not think anyone from a Xianbei tribe should claim to be an emperor. He wrote a letter to denounce Murong Jun, which exasperated Former Yan. In 356, a war broke out between Former Yan and Duan Qi, and Duan Qi was defeated in the war. Duan Kan asked for help from Jin, but it was too late. He was captured by Murong Jun and was executed in the following year.

See also
Xianbei
List of past Chinese ethnic groups
Five Barbarians
Duan tribe

References

350 establishments
Former countries in Chinese history
Duan tribe